Garage Moi is a self-produced album by Marzio Scholten's IDENTIKIT which was released on 29 October 2013.

Dutch newspaper Het Parool was the first to review this album on 17 October 2013 and rated it with five (*****) stars, the maximum rating. One of their quotes in the review: "This isn't jazz, this is universal art.”

Track listing
Contragramma – 5:24
Garage Moi – 2:52
Heisenberg – 7:00
The Great Race – 6:10
Fire and Snow – 8:14
We Are All Bankers – 4:31
The Architect – 5:05
The Architect II – 5:47
The Architect III – 3:31

All compositions by Marzio Scholten

Personnel
Marzio Scholten – Guitar
Lars Dietrich – Alto Sax
Jasper Blom – Tenor Sax
Sean Fasciani – Electric Bass
Kristijan Krajncan – Drums

References 

2013 albums
Marzio Scholten albums